Priseaca is a commune in Olt County, Muntenia, Romania. It is composed of three villages: Buicești, Priseaca, and Săltănești.

Natives
 Diicul Buicescul

References

Communes in Olt County
Localities in Muntenia